This is a list of crime films released in 1990.

References

1990